Cercerini is a tribe of hymenopterans in the family Crabronidae. There are at least 2 genera and 900 described species in Cercerini. About 870 of these species are in the large genus Cerceris.

Genera
These two genera belong to the tribe Cercerini:
 Cerceris Latreille, 1802 i g b
 Eucerceris Cresson, 1865 i c g b
Data sources: i = ITIS, c = Catalogue of Life, g = GBIF, b = Bugguide.net

References

Further reading

External links

 

Crabronidae